Epilobium collinum is a species of flowering plant belonging to the family Onagraceae.

Its native range is Europe to Western Siberia.

References

collinum